Group A of the 2001 Fed Cup Europe/Africa Zone Group I was one of four pools in the Europe/Africa Zone Group I of the 2001 Fed Cup. Four teams competed in a round robin competition, with the top team advancing to the play-offs and the bottom team being relegated down to Group II for 2002.

Netherlands vs. Macedonia

Yugoslavia vs. Poland

Netherlands vs. Poland

Yugoslavia vs. Macedonia

Netherlands vs. Yugoslavia

Poland vs. Macedonia

  failed to win any ties in the pool, and thus was relegated to Group II in 2002. However, they did not compete next year.

See also
Fed Cup structure

References

External links
 Fed Cup website

2001 Fed Cup Europe/Africa Zone